The following is a list of notable deaths in January 2006.

Entries for each day are listed alphabetically by surname. A typical entry lists information in the following sequence:
 Name, age, country of citizenship at birth, subsequent country of citizenship (if applicable), reason for notability, cause of death (if known), and reference.

January 2006

1
Haji Zakaria bin Muhammad Amin, 97, Indonesian ulama, natural causes.
Frank Cary, 85, American businessman, chairman of IBM (1973–1981), natural causes.
Mapita Cortés, 66, Puerto Rican actress, cancer.
Bryan Harvey, 49, American musician (House of Freaks), murdered.
Dawn Lake, 78, Australian entertainer, widow of Bobby Limb.
John Latham, 84, Zambian artist, natural causes.
Paul Lindblad, 64, American baseball player (Oakland Athletics), Alzheimer's disease.
Dragan Lukić, 77, Serbian writer, after long illness.
Harry Magdoff, 92, American socialist and editor, natural causes.
Charles O. Porter, 86, American politician, representative from Oregon (1957–1961), Alzheimer's disease.
Gideon Rodan, 71, American biochemist, cancer.
Hubert Schoemaker, 55, Dutch chemist, co-founder of Centocor, brain cancer.
Charles Steen, 86, American geologist and businessman.

2
Frank Butler, 89, British sports journalist.
Raul Davila, 74, Puerto Rican actor and television producer, heart attack.
Ofelia Fox, 82, Cuban nightclub owner (Tropicana Club), cancer.
Osa Massen, 91, Danish actress.
Klemens Mielczarek, 85, Polish actor.
Michael S. Smith, 59, American jazz drummer.
Francis Steinmetz, 91, Dutch author and Colditz Castle escapee.
Frank Wilkinson, 91, American civil liberties activist, natural causes.
John Wojtowicz, 60, American bankrobber, cancer.
John Woodnutt, 81, British actor.
Lidia Wysocka, 89, Polish actress.

3
Urbano Lazzaro, 81, Italian resistance fighter, capture of Benito Mussolini.
Steve Rogers, 51, Australian rugby league player, apparent suicide.
Sir William Skate, 52, Papua New Guinean politician, prime minister (1997–1999), stroke.
Bruce Wilson, 64, Australian journalist, cancer.

4
John Hahn-Petersen, 75, Danish actor, heart attack.
Sophie Heathcote, 33, Australian actress.
Milton Himmelfarb, 87, American essayist.
Stan Hunt, 76, American cartoonist.
Irving Layton, 93, Canadian poet, complications from Alzheimer's disease.
Sheikh Maktoum bin Rashid Al Maktoum, 62, Emirati emir, Ruler of Dubai and Prime Minister of the United Arab Emirates, heart attack.
Gretl Schörg, 91, Austrian actress.
Lourdes Van-Dúnem, 70, Angolan singer, typhoid fever.
Nel van Vliet, 79, Dutch swimmer.

5

Ramona Bell, 47, American wife of broadcaster Art Bell, asthma attack.
Rod Dedeaux, 91, American college baseball coach, complications from a stroke.
William H. G. FitzGerald, 96,  American investor, philanthropist and diplomat, ambassador to Ireland, aortic aneurysm.
Keizo Miura, 101, Japanese skier.
Lord Merlyn-Rees, 85, Welsh-born politician, former British Home Secretary, following a number of falls.
Ken Mosdell, 83, Canadian ice hockey forward, former Montreal Canadiens hockey player.
Mark Roberts, 84, American actor.
Simon Shanks, 34, American football player, linebacker for the Arizona Cardinals in 1995, murdered by home intruder.
Rachel Squire, 51, British Labour Member of Parliament for Dunfermline and West Fife, stroke.
Alex St. Clair, 64, American musician, primarily with Captain Beefheart.
Vajramuni, 62, Indian actor.

6
Allaire du Pont, 92, American thoroughbred enthusiast, owner of Kelso, natural causes.
Roshan Khan, 76, Pakistani squash player, complications from a heart attack and coma.
Józef Milik, 83, Polish Catholic priest and Dead Sea Scrolls scholar.
Comandanta Ramona, 47, Mexican Tzotzil Zapatista rebel leader and women's rights advocate, kidney disease and tuberculosis.
Lou Rawls, 72, American jazz and blues singer, lung and brain cancer.
Hugh Thompson, Jr., 62, Vietnamese War helicopter pilot who helped stop the My Lai Massacre, removed from life support.
Stanley Roger Tupper, 84, American politician, former Republican United States Representative from Maine from 1961 to 1967.
Gábor Zavadszky, 31, Hungarian footballer (soccer player), probably pulmonary embolism.

7

Urano Teixeira da Matta Bacellar, 58, Brazilian soldier, head of the UN peacekeeping force in Haiti, suicide.
Heinrich Harrer, 93, Austrian mountaineer, sportsman, geographer and author.
Alf McMichael, 78, Northern Irish footballer.
Jim Zulevic, 40, American actor, heart attack.

8

Tony Banks, Baron Stratford, 62, British politician and peer, former British Minister for Sport, stroke and cerebral hemorrhage.
Elson Becerra, 27, Colombian football player, shot.
Alex Elmsley, 76, English magician, heart attack.
Georg Wilhelm, Prince of Hanover, 90, German aristocrat, educator and Olympian.
James Robert Hightower, 90, American sinologist.
Katherine Peden, 80, American politician.
David Rosenbaum, 63, American journalist, The New York Times reporter, head injury during mugging.
Gloria Root, 57, American model and businesswoman, cancer.
Mimmo Rotella, 87, Italian artist, illness.
Raatbek Sanatbayev, 36, Kyrgyz Olympic Greco-Roman wrestler and candidate for National Olympic Committee president, shot.
José Luis Sánchez, 31, Argentine football (soccer) player, from injuries sustained in a motorcycle accident.

9

Andy Caldecott, 41, Australian Dakar Rally motorcycle rider, fatal neck injury sustained in an accident in Mauritania.
Patricia Hitt, 87, American Assistant Secretary of Health, Education, and Welfare under President Nixon, natural causes.
Selwyn Hughes, 77, British fundamentalist evangelical who founded Crusade for World Revival.
Mikk Mikiver, 68, Estonian stage director and actor.
W. Cleon Skousen, 92, American conservative author, BYU professor and prominent Latter-day Saint author and lecturer.
Gordon Smith, 55, Canadian inventor.
Jack Snow, 62, American NFL player and radio announcer, complications from a staph infection.
Don Stewart, 70, American actor (The Guiding Light), lung cancer.

10

Ira B. Black, 64, American neuroscientist, founder of the Stem Cell Institute of New Jersey, infection related to a tumor.
Dave Brown, 52, American NFL player, heart attack.
Elliot Forbes, 88, American conductor, musicologist, Harvard University professor and Beethoven scholar.
Sidney Frank, 86, American businessman and philanthropist, heart failure.
Alethea Hayter, 94, British writer.
Dennis Marks, 73, American animation writer-producer.
John Sinibaldi, 92, American Olympic cyclist.

11

Bernard Dafney, 37, American football player, heart attack.
Eric Namesnik, 35, American Olympic swimmer, injuries from a car crash.
Mark Spoon, 39, German DJ, prominent figure in trance music and member of (Jam & Spoon), heart attack.
Mabel Sine Wadsworth, 95, American birth control activist and wonen's health educator.

12

William Matthew Byrne, Jr., 75, American federal judge, presiding judge in the trial of Daniel Ellsberg, pulmonary fibrosis.
Brendan Cauldwell, 83, Irish actor, died in sleep.
Eldon Dedini, 84, American cartoonist, esophageal cancer.
Shaikh Faisal bin Hamad Al Khalifa, 14, Bahraini prince, injuries from a car crash.
Günther Landgraf, 77, German physicist and former president of Technische Universität Dresden.
Stewart Linder, 74, American Oscar-winning film editor.
Anne Meacham, 80, American stage (Suddenly, Last Summer) and television actress (Another World).
Meinrad Schütter, 95, Swiss composer.

13

Raúl Anguiano, 90, Mexican engraver and painter.
Gordon Atkinson, 83, Canadian broadcaster and politician.
Richard Dalitz, 80, Australian physicist, expert in exotic particles, studied quarks.
Frank Fixaris, 71, American sportscaster, house fire.
Ron Jessie, 57, American NFL wide receiver, heart attack.
Marc Potvin, 38, Canadian NHL player, found dead in his hotel room in Michigan, suicide.
Joan Root, 69, American wildlife conservationist, shot to death.

14

Henri Colpi, 84, Swiss film director and cinematographer.
Jim Gary, 66, American sculptor, complications from a cerebral hemorrhage.
Conrad Hendricks, 27, South African professional football player, car crash.
Bubba Morton, 74, American baseball player and coach.
Mark Philo, 21, English professional football player, injuries from a car crash.
Bob Weinstock, 77, American record producer, founded independent jazz record label Prestige Records, complications of diabetes.
Shelley Winters, 85, American actress (The Diary of Anne Frank, Lolita, The Poseidon Adventure), Oscar winner (1960, 1966), heart failure.

15

Jaber Al-Ahmad Al-Jaber Al-Sabah, 79, Kuwaiti Emir, brain hemorrhage.
Glyn Berry, 59, Welsh-born Canadian diplomat in Afghanistan.
Hilma Contreras, 95, Dominican writer.
Edward N. Hall, 91, U.S. Air Force rocket expert, father of the Minuteman intercontinental ballistic missile program.
Gregory Kimble, 88, American psychologist.
William Post, 66, American lottery winner.
George Worth, 90, American Olympic fencer.

16

Stanley Biber, 82, American physician and pioneer in sex reassignment surgery, complications of pneumonia.
Jan Mark, 62, British children's writer, meningitis.
Richard P. McCormick, 89, American historian, professor at Rutgers University.
Willie Smith, 66, American baseball player, heart attack.

17

Clarence Ray Allen, 76, American convicted murderer, executed by lethal injection.
Harold R. Collier, 90, American politician, former Republican United States Representative from Illinois from 1957 to 1975.
Wallace Mercer, 59, British businessman, former chairman of Heart of Midlothian F.C., cancer.
Giles Worsley, 44, British architectural historian and journalist, nephew of the Katharine, Duchess of Kent, cancer.

18

Leonardo Ribeiro de Almeida, 81, Portuguese politician.
Norman McCabe, 94, American animator and director, famous for Tokio Jokio and The Ducktators shorts from his Termite Terrace tenure at Warner Bros.
Thomas Murphy, 90, American former CEO of General Motors.
Anton Rupert, 89, South African businessman, philanthropist and founding member of World Wide Fund for Nature, natural causes.
Stjepan Steiner, 90, Croatian physician, doctor to Josip Broz Tito.
Jan Twardowski, 90, Polish priest and poet.

19

Gábor Agárdy, 83, Hungarian actor (The Round-Up, Mattie the Goose-boy).
Gary Downie, South African psychotherapist and television production manager (Doctor Who, Star Cops), cancer.
Anthony Franciosa, 77, American actor, third husband of Shelley Winters, stroke.
Tom Nugent, 92, American football coach, member of the College Football Hall of Fame, congestive heart failure.
Wilson Pickett, 64, American soul singer, heart attack.
Awn Alsharif Qasim, 73, Sudanese writer, educator and Islamic scholar.
Geoff Rabone, 84, New Zealand cricketer.
Franz Seitz, 84, German film director.

20

Elmer Otto Friday, 81, American politician.
Andrei Iordan, 71, Kyrgyz politician, former prime minister of Kyrgyzstan.
David Maust, 51, American convicted serial killer, heart failure after a botched suicide attempt.
Dave Lepard, 25, Swedish musician (Crashdïet), suicide.
Rose Nader, 99, Lebanese-born president of the Shafeek Nader Trust for the Community Interest, heart failure.
Pio Taofinu'u, 82, Samoan Roman Catholic cardinal.
Leslie Wilson, 80, British Olympic cyclist.

21 

Michael Chan, Baron Chan, 65, British paediatrician, second peer of Chinese origin.
John James Cowperthwaite, 90, British civil servant, Financial Secretary of Hong Kong (1961–1971).
Robert Knudson, 80, American sound engineer, three-time Academy Award winner, supranuclear palsy.
Ibrahim Rugova, 61, Kosovan politician, President of Kosovo, lung cancer.

22 

Janette Carter, 82, American last living member of the Carter Family country music group.
Alec Coxon, 90, English cricketer, Yorkshire and England player.
Sherman Ferguson, 61, American jazz drummer.
Aydın Güven Gürkan, 65, Turkish academic and politician (chairman of SHP).
Nellie Y. McKay, 67, African-American literary critic, colon cancer.

23 

Ernie Baron, 65, Filipino radio/TV host and meteorologist, heart attack brought about by diabetes.
Andrea Bronfman, 60, American philanthropist and wife of Charles Bronfman, hit by car.
Savino Guglielmetti, 94, Italian gymnast, 1928 Olympic gold-medalist and oldest surviving Olympic champion.
Samuel W. Koster, 86, United States Army officer, highest ranking United States Army officer charged in My Lai massacre, renal cancer.
Chris McKinstry, 38, Canadian independent researcher in artificial intelligence, suicide.
Joseph M. Newman, 96, American film director/producer, This Island Earth.
Bill Rice, 74, American artist.
Virginia Smith, 94, American politician, former Republican United States Representative from Nebraska (1975–1991).
Michael Wharton, 92, British humorist ("Peter Simple").

24 

Zaki Badawi, 84, Egyptian Islamic scholar, Islamic religious leader in Britain.
Schafik Handal, 75, Salvadoran politician, former presidential candidate and leader of El Salvador's main political opposition party, the FMLN, heart attack.
Kiki Heck, 81, Dutch Olympic diver 
Peter Ladefoged, 80, American phonetician, stroke.
Carlos (Café) Martínez, 40, Venezuelan corner infielder, former MLB player, complications from a long illness.
Fayard Nicholas, 91, American dancer, elder of the renowned Nicholas Brothers, pneumonia and complications of a stroke.
Chris Penn, 40, American actor (Footloose, Reservoir Dogs, The Funeral), heart disease.
Sir Nicholas Shackleton, 68, British geologist, leukaemia.

25 

Robin Coombs, 84, British immunologist, developed Coombs Antibody test
Marion Dudley, 33, American convicted murderer, executed in Texas.
Luther Green, 59, American NBA player, lung cancer.
John F. Kerin, Australian professor, reproductive scientist and gynaecologist, farm accident.
Anna Malle, 38, American adult film actress, car accident.
Herbert Schilder, 77, American dental surgeon, improved root canal procedures, Lewy body disease.
Sudharmono, 78, Indonesian politician and lieutenant general, vice president of Indonesia from 1988 to 1993, pneumonia.
Allan Temko, 81, American architectural critic and writer, Pulitzer Prize-winning architecture critic for the San Francisco Chronicle, brief illness.

26 

Len Carlson, 68, Canadian voice actor, heart attack during sleep.
John Dunwoody, 76, British Member of Parliament, effects of an accident.
Morris Silverman, 93, American philanthropist, founder of the Albany Medical Center Prize in Medicine and Biomedical Research.
Dave Tatsuno, 92, Japanese American businessman, documented the Topaz Japanese internment camp in his film Topaz.
Khan Wali Khan, 89, Pakistani politician, prominent opposition Leader and prominent Pashtun leader, heart attack.

27 

Maurice Colclough, 52, English Rugby Union player, brain tumour.
Tana Hoban, 88, American photographer of children, author of over 110 children's books.
Phyllis King, 100, British Wimbledon winner.
Carol Lambrino, 86, Romanian Prince, elder son of King Carol II of Romania.
Christopher Lloyd, 84, British gardening writer, stroke.
Gene McFadden, 56, American singer and songwriter, cancer.
Victor Mishcon, Baron Mishcon, 90, British solicitor and politician.
Johannes Rau, 75, German politician, President of Germany (Bundespräsident) from 1999 to 2004.

28 
Peter Isola, 76, Gibraltarian politician, Deputy Chief Minister of Gibraltar (1956–1984).
Yitzchak Kaduri, 106, Iraqi-born renowned Sephardic Orthodox rabbi and kabbalist.
Henry McGee, 76, British actor.
Sauli Rytky, 87, Finnish cross-country skier and Olympic medalist.

29 
Andrew Gonzalez, 65, Filipino linguist and educator, complications from diabetes.
Lau Mulder, 78, Dutch field hockey player and Olympic medalist.
Nam June Paik, 73, South Korean-born American artist, particularly noted for his video art, natural causes.
George Psychoundakis, 85, Greek Resistance fighter during World War II.

30 

Stew Albert, 66, American 1960s anti-establishment activist, co-founder of the Yippies, liver cancer.
Paul Clinton, 53, American CNN film critic, founder of the Broadcast Film Critics Association (BFCA).
Seth Fisher, 33, American comic book illustrator, fall from a building.
Arnold Graffi, 95, German Researcher for oncology, long illness.
Coretta Scott King, 78, American civil rights leader, widow of Martin Luther King Jr., ovarian cancer.
Otto Lang, 98, Bosnian-born American film producer and ski mogul, heart disease.
Irving Rosenwater, 73, English statistician and author.
Wendy Wasserstein, 55, American playwright, lymphoma.

31 

Owen Abrahams, 72, Australian rules footballer, serious illness.
Ruairi Brugha, 88, Irish Fianna Fáil politician, son of Cathal Brugha.
Henry S. Coleman, 79, American educational administrator, dean at Columbia University.
Boris Kostelanetz, 94, Russian-born American tax lawyer.
George Koval, 92, Soviet intelligence agent.
Paul Regina, 49, American actor, liver cancer.
Jason Sears, 38, American punk rock singer (Rich Kids on LSD), complications from drug abuse.
Moira Shearer, 80, British ballerina, actress, and newspaper columnist, married to Sir Ludovic Kennedy, natural causes.

References 

2006-01
 01